Arctowski Peak is a somewhat isolated ice-covered peak,  high, standing  west-southwest of the head of Howkins Inlet, on the east coast of Palmer Land. It was discovered and photographed from the air in December 1940 by members of the United States Antarctic Service. During 1947 the peak was photographed from the air by members of the Ronne Antarctic Research Expedition, under Finn Ronne, who in conjunction with the Falkland Islands Dependencies Survey (FIDS) charted it from the ground. It was named by the FIDS for Henryk Arctowski.

References
 

Mountains of Palmer Land
Poland and the Antarctic